The 1978 Nations motorcycle Grand Prix was the fifth round of the 1978 Grand Prix motorcycle racing season. It took place on the weekend of 12–14 May 1978 at the Autodromo Internazionale del Mugello.

Classification

500 cc

350cc

250cc

125cc

50cc

Sidecar classification

References

Italian motorcycle Grand Prix
Nations Grand Prix
Nations Grand Prix